The Ladby ship is a major ship burial at the village of Ladby near Kerteminde in Denmark. It is of the type also represented by the boat chamber grave of Hedeby and the ship burials of Oseberg, Borre, Gokstad and Tune in South Norway, all of which date back to the 9th and 10th centuries. It is the only ship burial from the Viking Age discovered in Denmark (Hedeby was a Danish Viking settlement, but today is located in Germany). It has been preserved at the site where it was discovered, which today is part of a museum.

Discovery 
The grave is situated within an otherwise unremarkable burial site from the Viking Age. Excavations revealed an abundance of grave goods consisting of both objects and animals. It has been dated to the early 10th century, based on a gilded link of bronze for a dog-harness, decorated in the Jelling style, found there. .

The grave had been extensively damaged. Since only a few small human bones were found, researchers have concluded that the site is a translation, a conversion from a heathen to a Christian grave . Another interpretation is that the struggle for dominance by King Haraldr Blátönn and his heir, Sveinn Tjúguskegg, may have led to the grave's desecration . The ship was a symbol of power—easily visible to all who travelled or lived in the area—glorifying the minor king buried with it . By removing the deceased and chopping all his grave goods into hundreds of pieces within a few years of the burial, the attackers presumably gave his heirs a great blow to their family prestige .

The site was discovered on or around February 28, 1935, near Kerteminde in northeastern Fyn, Denmark, by pharmacist and amateur archaeologist Poul Helweg Mikkelsen. Original drawings by Mikkelsen and Danish National Museum conservator Gustav Rosenberg constitute the primary source-material for information on the find . Mikkelsen paid for an arched building to be raised above the site, which was then covered with earth and grass . The ship was then given to the National Museum, which had full responsibility for the site until 1994, when responsibility passed to the Department of Archaeology and Landscape at the Viking Museum at Ladby (part of The Museums of Eastern Funen).

Two factors regarding the discovery of ships in general are relevant to the discovery of the Ladby Ship. First, ship burial sites are often found on higher terrain, hilltops, slopes, and beach ridges. Second, ship burial sites are usually found in close proximity to the water, whether it be a lake, a fjord, or the sea. The Ladby Ship is thus typical of many ship burial sites, as it is located on top of a mound, near Keterminde Fjord. Presumably, the ship was dragged up from the Fjord to the top of the mound with the assistance of rollers, as was the case with the Oseberg Ship. The ship is a longship that carried 30-32 rowers. While Rosenberg gave no description of the shape of the mound, Mikkelsen described it as an oval. Rosenberg hoped to find stones in a circle-formation around the mound, but instead he discovered a collection of stones to the north and south of the ship and a small pile to the east. Since the stones lie at a higher level than the row of rivets that outline the ship's gunwale, it is unlikely that the stones were used to support the ship in the burial. Rosenberg concluded that the stones came from a previous mound on the site that was destroyed when the ship-grave was constructed.

Excavation  

The Ship

The ship was excavated between 1935 and 1937 under Rosenberg's direction. Because the ship is very old, almost all of the ship's wood had disintegrated before its initial discovery. However, the construction and shape of the ship is suggested by the arrangement of about 2,000 rivets that held the ship together that were excavated from the sand. During the excavation of the ship, Rosenberg marked a measuring-line along the central axis of the ship from stem to stern and concluded that the ship was 21.5 meters long. He calculated its greatest breadth to be approximately 2.75 meters and its depth at amidships to be 0.65 meters. Rosenberg made these estimates on the basis of the arrangement of the rivets, although the number and arrangement allow only an approximation of the ship's actual dimensions. Knud Thorvildsen, who succeeded Rosenberg as conservator in 1940, came to the same conclusions regarding the ship's dimensions.

Mikkelsen and Rosenberg each made important contributions to the description of the ship. During excavation, Rosenberg kept detailed journals that are still considered the most important source of information regarding the ship and its contents. Mikkelsen also kept a journal during excavation, but its entries only cover a period of less than three months, from May 21 to October 10, 1935. Rosenberg's and Mikkelsen's notes complement each other well. Rosenberg was more the specialist in his writing, using more colloquial language, while Mikkelsen's reflections are more emotional and focused on the discovery of the ship. According to his journal entries, Rosenberg at first believed that the iron pieces found with the ship did not belong to the stem, while Mikkelsen believed that they did. Mikkelson was relieved when Rosenberg changed his mind regarding the iron-pieces and concluded that they indeed belonged to the stem. The iron-pieces turned out to be spirally-rolled iron bands, which must have been placed as ornaments on the wooden stem, now dissolved. The spirals lay in a line for a length of roughly 60 cm. Rosenberg and Mikkelsen agreed that the stem, with its ornamentation, was meant to symbolize the mane on an animal, a dragon in particular, whose head had rotted away. Both larger and smaller longships typically had loose “stemterminations” carved into the shape of dragon-heads. Viking ships depicted in Viking-Age and medieval pictures do not always exhibit dragon-heads, and it is uncertain under what conditions such ornamentation was permitted on a ship. Large longships from the twelfth and thirteenth centuries—dreki (plural for drekar)—belonged to the king only. It is possible that the right to bear a dragon-head on one's ship was a royal privilege or a symbol of royal ownership. Smaller longships may have belonged to wealthy and influential persons, perhaps with a military or administrative association or obligation to the king, while larger longships belonged to the king himself. A dragon-ship may have been used in the campaigns of Harald Bluetooth.

After Mikkelsen found the north stem, they dug a little deeper to the north of the south stem's spirals, where they found iron nails lying at intervals of 25 cm from each other. These nails formed the eastern “gunwale edge” or top edge of the side of the boat. However, they did not find the nails on the western edge. Excavating continued near the south stem, as they searched for nails on the western side of the ship. According to Mikkelsen, some wood or bark layers there survived. While digging from the west part towards the middle of the ship to search for timber, Rosenberg noticed that the wood of the strakes was extant only where it had been in contact with iron. Although the ship's wood had mostly disintegrated, Mikkelsen and Rosenberg did find a deposit of wood (“Wood G”) along the west side of the ship, approximately in the middle of the disturbed area:

[A] piece of an apparently originally rather rounded, stout, short piece of wood, now only a round shell of such a piece, which stuck out from the gunwale 27 centimeters inside the ship. Another piece of wood, or shell of such a piece, lay from the end of the first piece pointing south, where it tapered off to a point. They were, I believe, only the remnants of originally much larger pieces of wood, now quite shapeless. A thin, narrow piece of wood lay over the side of the piece that ran from south to north and went from here athwartship about 20 centimeters in towards the middle of the ship.

It was initially impossible to tell if the wood came from the ship or not, and if so which part. However, within days Mikkelsen discovered a section of an undisturbed burial chamber—“the usual, which originally must have lain from gunwale to gunwale and covered over the contents of the ship”. Because wood lying to the west was “quite intact,” Rosenberg concluded that it came from various layers of wood that made up the structure of the ship, perhaps planks from the deck layer: “[I]t is therefore to be expected that there is a section of an undisturbed burial-chamber under the wooden covering and several large pieces of iron appear here, sticking up through the layer of wood”. These and other discoveries of wood deposits allowed them to draw conclusions regarding the construction and structure of the ship. A horizontal layer of reddish wood was discovered at 12–15 meters, which must have been part of a deck-layer of planks that had collapsed, lying undisturbed above the west side of the ship. They expected to find undisturbed parts of the grave below the deck layer. Below this layer of wood, between 11 and 13 meters, they found threads of a fibrous organic material that did not seem to be woven, but which could not be positively identified  (Sørensen, 31). No wood survived along the eastern part of the ship. Mikkelsen's journal also notes that large pieces of wood appeared to be missing from the eastern side of the ship. It is unclear how much of the ship's planks survived the excavation itself.

Grave Goods

Number of grave goods were found in the burial site, including weapons, riding gear, utensils, textiles, tools, and even board games. Special attention has been paid to the ship's anchor, as it is remarkably well-preserved. Mikkelsen discovered the Ladby ship anchor with its chain and rope, and in his journal he recounts the excitement of finding the anchor, noting that many observers watched the discovery with great interest. The Ladby anchor is an example of a stocked anchor, an anchor with a heavy wood stock that is placed at right angles to the flukes, allowing the anchor flukes to grip the sea floor securely. The anchor's chain served two important functions: it increased the weight of the entire anchor apparatus, and it served as a “spring” to reduce the pull of the ship from wind and waves. The other end of the anchor chain was tied to the ship by rope the anchor there is an anchor-rope which is tied to the ship. The Ladby anchor is thought to be larger than the Oseberg ship's anchor, located in Norway. The anchor was located on the port side, right forward in the prow, with the shank in a roughly horizontal position pointing backwards towards the stern. The anchor was in good condition, while the chain was in bad shape, resting in roughly two piles at the bottom of the ship, beneath the shank and chain.

Carl V. Solver visited the Ladby ship in 1940 and measured the anchor and chain and removed links from the chain to be analyzed at the State testing laboratory. Solver estimated that the chain contained roughly 60 links and was a total length of roughly 10–12 meters in length. In a later publication, Solver estimated the number of links in the chain to be about 50, with a total length of about 10 meters . When the anchor-chain was cleaned in 1994, it was discovered that Solver's measurement of the first link was incorrect. Solver stated that the length of this link was 10 centimeters, while the 1994 survey conducted by archaeologists has shown that it is only about 15 centimeters long. Corrosion has altered the appearance of the links: the iron has cracked from contact with the soil and flakes off in large pieces on contact. Cleaning the chain revealed that the individual links—which unlike the exposed links still contain a high percentage of iron—are not the same size. The chain consists of at least 78 differently shaped links, the smallest of which is 13 centimeters. Because the chain links were rusted together, it has not been possible to estimate whether the different types of links were arranged according to a system—for example with the smallest links gathered together immediately after the anchor itself. The total length of the chain cannot be calculated exactly, but given an average length per link of 17.9 centimeters, the chain is probably about 11 meters in length.

Near the anchor were found remains of rope that Mikkelson argued was made from wood-bast. However, rope maker Ole Magnus has concluded that it was made from lime-bast. According to Magnus, the rope is not strong enough to have been the actual anchor-rope, as it is only 24 mm in diameter. The rope may have been fixed to the buoy-ring on the anchor and used for dragging the anchor up. It is also possible, however, that it served a completely different function, since it is not unusual for rope to be stored in the prow. Remains of a thinner rope made from lime bast were also found (Sørensen 52). Magnus observed sand in the rope, concluding that it must have been immersed in water and lying on the sea floor.

Horses

Mikkelsen and Rosenberg discovered eleven horse skeletons in the ship's grave, at the bow of the ship. From looking at illustrations of the ship on the Bayeux Tapestry—a cloth from the eleventh century depicting seventy-five events leading up to the Norman conquest of England––some scholars have concluded that Viking war vessels such as the Ladby Ship were used to transport horses. Some scholars have taken a skeptical attitude towards the claim that the ship was used to transport horses. For example, according to Stephen Morillo, it would have been impossible to transport horses on the ship. Danish sea scouts constructed a replica of the ship to test the hypothesis that the ship was used for carrying horses. They found that, since the ship is very wide and flat, both rowers and horses can easily board the ship. Furthermore, they were able to sail the ship with the horses in shallow and calmer waters along the coast. However, it became clear that the turbulence and rolling of the open sea would have thrown the horses into the sea, as the low freeboard running along the ship's sides only reached the horses’ knees.

Viking Museum Ladby 

Now the Viking Museum at Ladby displays many of the original finds and offers an engaging overview of the Viking era as it unfolded on the north east of the island of Funen. The new building from 2007 also contains a reconstruction of the ship burial. It shows the scene as it may have looked right after the funeral, with the deceased chieftain lying on a bed in a full-scale replica of his ship, with all his grave goods, near his dogs and his eleven horses. There is also an interpretive movie about the Vikings' beliefs regarding the journey to the realm of the dead, based on Norse myths and the images on the Gotlandic Picture stones.

Literature
 Sørensen, Anne C.: Ladby. A Danish Ship-Grave from the Viking Age, Ships and Boats of The North, Vol. 3; Viking Ship Museum in collaboration with the National Museum of Denmark and Kertemindeegnens Museer, Roskilde 2001,

References

Sources
Summary of: Ladby. A Danish Ship-Grave from the Viking Age Viking Ship Museum Roskilde.
 The Ladby Ship 1001 stories of Denmark, The Heritage Agency of Denmark. Audio-file available.

External links
 The Viking Museum Ladby

Viking ships
Archaeological discoveries in Denmark
Ships preserved in museums
Viking ship burials
Kerteminde Municipality
Viking Age museums